Homostiidae is a family of flattened arthrodire placoderms from the Early to Middle Devonian.  Fossils appear in various strata in Europe, Russia, Morocco, Australia, Canada and Greenland.

Many homostiids have "toothless" jaws, and large sizes. suggesting that many homostiids were probably filter feeders, like the also noticeably flattened Rhincodon typus.

All homostiids have flattened and elongated skulls.  According to Denison 1978, primitive homostiids have moderately long median dorsal plates, whereas in "advanced" homostiids, the median dorsal tends to be short and broad.

Obruchev (1964) placed the following primitive genera Euleptaspis, Lophostracon and Luetkeichthys in a separate family, "Euleptaspididae," and Ørvig (1969), claimed that the Euleptaspidids were totally unrelated to Homostiidae proper (i.e., being neither related to, nor ancestral), but, according to Denison, did not clearly explain his reasons why this was so.

Genera

Angarichthys
A comparatively large animal from the Middle Devonian of Siberia, with a head shield estimated around 40 centimeters long.  Known only from an infragnathal bone, and an intero-lateral and a marginal plate.

Antineosteus
A primitive homostiid from Emsian-aged strata of Morocco.  Antineosteus' primitive anatomical features suggest it may be a precursor to Angarichthys, Atlantidosteus and Homosteus.  Antineosteus lived sympatrically with the Moroccan species of Atlantidosteus.

Atlantidosteus
This genus is known from species found in Emsian-aged Morocco and Middle Devonian Australia.  Overall form is very similar to Antineosteus and Homosteus.

Cavanosteus
A primitive genus from Emsian-aged strata of Australia

Cathlesichthys

A genus of homostiid from Wee Jasper, living during the Early Devonian.

Euleptaspis
This genus is known from isolated plates and fragments from Lower Devonian-aged strata in Spitzbergen and Germany.  The holotype of the type species, E. depressa, is a paranuchal plate very similar to those seen in coccosteids.

Dhanguura?
A very large, primitive form from the Early Devonian Taemas-Wee Jasper Reef fauna.  Its discoverer, Gavin Young, hypothesizes that it may have been a filter-feeder.

Homosteus
The type genus, known from both complete and fragmentary fossils in Europe, Russia, and North America.

Lophostracon

Luetkeichthys

Tityosteus
Tityosteus is thought to be the largest vertebrate known from the Lower Devonian, with an estimated length of 2.5 meters.  The holotype  is an incomplete individual from the Hunsrück.

References 

 
Placoderm families
Middle Devonian extinctions
Early Devonian first appearances